HMS Greetham was one of 93 ships of the  of inshore minesweepers. All ships in this class had names chosen from villages ending in -ham. The minesweeper was built by the firm of Herd & McKenzie in Buckie, Moray and was named after Greetham, Lincolnshire. Entering service in 1955, the vessel was transferred to the Libyan Navy in 1962 on loan and permanently in 1966. Renamed Zuara, the minesweeper was used as a patrol vessel until 1973. Zuara was sold to Captain Morgan Cruises of Malta for commercial use and renamed Lady Davinia. The ship was taken out of service in 2007 and laid up at Sliema Creek. Lady Davinia sank at her moorings in 2008 and for a short time became a diving attraction but in 2011 the wreck was partially broken up after being named a navigational hazard.

Design and description
The vessels were propelled by two shafts powered by two Davey Paxman 12-cylinder diesel engines creating .

Ham-class minesweepers were armed with one  Mk 7 Bofors gun or one  cannon. The vessels were equipped with Type 978 radar and had a complement of 15. The class was designed to operate in shallow coastal waters and were of wooden construction.

Service history
The minesweeper was ordered on 17 October 1951 and constructed by Herd & McKenzie at their yard in Buckie, Scotland. The ship was launched on 19 April 1954. These were the first two ships in the newly formed Libyan Navy. She was transferred permanently in September 1966, and she was renamed Zuara. She was used as a coastal patrol vessel until 1973, when she was decommissioned.

That year, Zuara was sold to Captain Morgan Cruises, a Maltese tour operator, and was renamed MV Lady Davinia. For a number of years she had a distinctive red and white Kit Kat paint scheme. In 2007 she was decommissioned and was laid up in Sliema Creek awaiting her fate. Lady Davinia sank at her moorings in Sliema Creek in 2008. The exact date of sinking is unknown. The site quickly became popular with divers, as it was easily accessible and was full of marine life. Since it was not purposely sunk, the wreck was intact, with wine bottles and cutlery scattered around it, and soft drinks and beer cans still in the fridge.

The wreck was to be lifted and broken up in June 2011 as it was considered a navigational hazard. However, the workers only managed to remove part of the wreck, leaving the stern, engines and heaps of twisted metal at the bottom. Some remaining oil in the ship's tanks was spilt, and large holes were dug in the seabed. Due to this, most of the marine life area around the wreck was killed off.

References

Notes

Citations

Sources
 
 
 

 

Ham-class minesweepers
Ships built in Scotland
1954 ships
Cold War minesweepers of the United Kingdom
Royal Navy ship names
Ham-class minesweepers of the Libyan Navy
Ships of Malta
Maritime incidents in 2008
Shipwrecks of Malta
Sliema